Chinavia aseada is a species of plant bugs belonging to the family Pentatomidae that is endemic to Passo Fundo, Brazil.

References

Insects described in 1983
Nezarini
Hemiptera of South America
Endemic fauna of Brazil